The 2021–22 Wichita State Shockers men's basketball team represented Wichita State University in the 2021–22 NCAA Division I men's basketball season. The Shockers, led by second year head coach Isaac Brown, played their home games at Charles Koch Arena in Wichita, Kansas as members of the American Athletic Conference.

Previous season
In a season limited due to the ongoing COVID-19 pandemic, the Shockers finished the 2020–21 season 16–6, 11–2 in AAC play to win the regular season championship. On February 26, 2021 then interim coach Isaac Brown was named permanent head coach, agreeing to a five-year deal. In the AAC tournament, they defeated South Florida before losing to Cincinnati in the semifinals. The Shockers received an at-large bid to the NCAA tournament, where they lost to Drake in the First Four.

Offseason

Departures

Incoming transfers

2021 recruiting class

Preseason

AAC preseason media poll

On October 13, The American released the preseason Poll and other preseason awards.

Preseason Awards
 AAC Preseason Player of the Year - Tyson Etienne
 AAC Preseason All-Conference First Team - Tyson Etienne

Roster

Schedule and results

|-
!colspan=12 style=| Exhibition

|-
!colspan=12 style=| Non-conference regular season

|-
!colspan=12 style=| AAC Regular Season

|-
!colspan=12 style=| AAC tournament

Source

Awards and honors

References

Wichita State
Wichita State Shockers men's basketball seasons
Wichita State
Wichita State